Events in the year 2021 in Luxembourg.

Incumbents

Monarch: Henri
Prime Minister: Xavier Bettel

Events
Ongoing — COVID-19 pandemic in Luxembourg
11 December - Several hundred people demonstrated in Luxembourg on Saturday against the anti-Covid measures adopted in the Grand Duchy. The rally, flown over by a helicopter and drones, was strictly supervised by Luxembourg police, supported by reinforcements from neighboring Belgium, after overflows that occurred on Saturday, December 4 during a similar demonstration. The protesters then forced the entrance to a Christmas market and threw eggs at the home of Prime Minister Xavier Bettel, demanding his resignation. The police this time used a water cannon to repel a group of demonstrators who were trying to force the roadblock blocking access to the city center by throwing firecrackers and smoke bombs. A dozen people were arrested.

Deaths

8 January – Emile Hemmen, poet (born 1923).
12 February – Carlo Wagner, politician, (born 1953).
9 March – Josy Stoffel, swimmer (born 1928).
17 April – Paul Helminger, politician (born 1940).

References

 
2020s in Luxembourg
Years of the 21st century in Luxembourg
Luxembourg
Luxembourg